Misha Raitzin (1930 – May 9, 1990) was a tenor with the Metropolitan Opera.

Born in Ukraine, Raitzin studied as a tenor at the Moscow Conservatory. After graduating, he rose to become a leading tenor at the Bolshoi Opera in Moscow. He also performed widely as a soloist, performing with many of the leading European orchestras. He emigrated to Israel in 1972 where he performed at the Tel Aviv Opera and with the Israel Philharmonic. He debuted with the Metropolitan Opera in 1975. He soon moved to New York and sang many leads as a member of the Metropolitan Opera Company. He was also a masterful performer of cantorial and Jewish folk music, being featured on numerous albums in both the Jewish and Operatic genres.

Misha died of a lung aneurysm on May 9, 1990 n New York City, United States.

References

External links
Nytimes.com
News.google.com
Allmusic.com

1930 births
1990 deaths
Ukrainian operatic tenors
20th-century Ukrainian male opera singers
Moscow Conservatory alumni